Tanaophysopsis is a monotypic moth genus of the family Crambidae described by Eugene G. Munroe in 1964. Its only species, Tanaophysopsis xanthyalinalis, described by George Hampson in 1918, is found in Ecuador.

References

Spilomelinae
Taxa named by Eugene G. Munroe
Crambidae genera
Monotypic moth genera